The Yale Edition of the Complete Works of St. Thomas More is the standard scholarly edition of the works of Thomas More, published by Yale University Press. The first of the fifteen volumes to be published (volume 2) appeared in 1963, and the last (volume 1) in 1997. The English works are provided with glossaries, and the Latin works with facing English translations.

Volumes
The full list of volumes to date is:

 Volume 1: English Poems. Life of Pico. The Last Things. Edited by Anthony S. G. Edwards, Katherine Gardiner Rodgers, and Clarence H. Miller. 1997. 
 Volume 2: The History of King Richard III. Edited by Richard S. Sylvester. 1963. 
 Volume 3, Part I: Translations of Lucian. Edited by Craig R. Thompson. 1974. 
 Volume 3, Part II: Latin Poems. Edited by Clarence H. Miller, Leicester Bradner, and Charles A. Lynch. 1984. 
 Volume 4: Utopia. Edited by Edward Surtz S.J. and J. H. Hexter. 1965. 
 Volume 5: Responsio ad Lutherum. Edited by John Headley. 1969. 
 Volume 6, Parts I & II: A Dialogue Concerning Heresies. Edited by Thomas M. C. Lawler, Germain Marc'hadour, and Richard C. Marius. 1981. 
 Volume 7: Letter to Bugenhagen, Supplication of Souls, Letter Against Frith. Edited by Frank Manley, Clarence H. Miller, and Richard C. Marius. 1990. 
 Volume 8, Parts I-III: The Confutation of Tyndale's Answer. Edited by Louis A. Schuster, Richard C. Marius, and James P. Lusardi. 1973.
 Volume 9: The Apology. Edited by J. B. Trapp. 1979. 
 Volume 10: The Debellation of Salem and Bizance. Edited by John Guy, Clarence H. Miller, and Ralph Keen. 1988. 
 Volume 11: The Answer to a Poisoned Book. Edited by Clarence H. Miller and Stephen M. Foley. 1985. 
 Volume 12: A Dialogue of Comfort against Tribulation. Edited by Louis L. Martz and Frank Manley. 1976.
 Volume 13: Treatise on the Passion, Treatise on the Blessed Body, Instructions and Prayers. Edited by Garry E. Haupt. 1976. 
 Volume 14: De Tristitia Christi. Edited by Clarence H. Miller. 1976. 
 Volume 15: In Defense of Humanism: Letters to Dorp, Oxford, Lee, and a Monk. Edited by Daniel Kinney. 1986.

References

External links
 Listing on Yale University Press website.

Textual criticism
More, St. Thomas
Yale University Press books